In histology, the HOPS stain is a way of marking tissue for microscopic examination.  HOPS is an acronym for haematoxylin, orcein, phyloxin and saffron.

Appearance of tissues stained with HOPS
nuclei appear blue (haematoxylin)
elastin appears black (orcein)
muscle appears red (phyloxin)
connective tissue appears yellow (saffron)

References

External links
Histopathology Laboratory - Kingston General Hospital.

Staining